Pantydia sparsa is a moth of the family Erebidae. It is found in Queensland and on Norfolk Island. This species was introduced to New Zealand in 2004.

The wingspan is about 40 mm.

The larvae feed on a wide range of plants, including Medicago sativa, Dillwynia ericifolia and Exocarpus aphyllus.

Gallery

References

Moths described in 1852
Pantydia